Flomoxef is an oxacephem antibiotic that was developed by Shionogi.

It has been classified either as a second-generation  or fourth-generation cephalosporin.

It was patented in 1982 and approved for medical use in 1988 under the trade name Flumarin.

References

Cephalosporin antibiotics
Tetrazoles
Primary alcohols
Sulfides
Carboxylic acids
Lactams
Ethers
Carboxamides
Organofluorides